Hlavňovice is a municipality and village in Klatovy District in the Plzeň Region of the Czech Republic. It has about 500 inhabitants.

Administrative parts
Villages and hamlets of Častonice, Čeletice, Cihelna, Horní Staňkov, Javoříčko, Libětice, Milínov, Pích, Přestanice, Puchverk, Radostice, Suchá, Zámyšl and Zvíkov are administrative parts of Hlavňovice.

Gallery

References

Villages in Klatovy District